Green slime may refer to:

 Intelligence Corps, of the British Army
 The Green Slime a 1968 science-fiction film directed by Kinji Fukasaku
 "Green Slime" (song), a song by the Fuzztones
 "Green Slime" (song), a song by John Carter
 Green slime (You Can't Do That on Television), a substance used on the Nickelodeon television series, You Can't Do That on Television